Sedum cyprium, the Cyprus stonecrop, is an erect, monocarpic, succulent herb with an unbranched stem, 10–30 cm high. Leaves succulent, simple and entire reddish in sunny positions, the basal leaves in rosettes, hairless, spathulate, 3-6 x 1–2 cm, the higher leaves are thinly glandular and spirally arranged. Its numerous actinomorphic flowers are greenish or reddish, gathered in a cylindrical panicle. Sedum cyprium flowers from June to September. Its fruit has a many-seeded follicle.

Habitat
Rock crevices  and walls mostly on igneous formations at 150–1650 m altitude.

Distribution
A Cyprus endemic, locally very common in the broader Troödos Mountains, especially in the Paphos Forest-Akamas, Ayia, Stavros Psokas, Ayios Merkourios, Fleyia, Alonoudhi, Kryos Potamos, Makria Kontarka (Troödos), Evrykhou, Kalopanayiotis, Alona, Palaichori Oreinis and Palaichori Morphou.

References

 The Endemic Plants of Cyprus, Texts: Takis Ch. Tsintides, Photographs: Laizos Kourtellarides, Cyprus Association of Professional Foresters, Bank of Cyprus Group, Nicosia 1998,

External links

 http://www.atfreeforum.com/ps/viewtopic.php?p=25530&sid=e8e07099b4d69eb5e2ad86f9732baea1&mforum=ps
 https://www.biolib.cz/en/image/id229122/
 http://www.theplantlist.org/statistics/
 http://www.moa.gov.cy/moa/fd/fd.nsf/0/6BE7CEEC165CE42FC22577AB00269E80/$file/Sedum cyprium-1.jpg?OpenElement
 http://www.rareplants.es/shop/uploads/images_versions_large/6066.jpg

cyprium
Endemic flora of Cyprus